Thómas saga Erkibyskups is an Icelandic saga on Saint Thomas Becket written in the 14th century and based on earlier sources: a now lost "Life" by Robert of Cricklade which was written soon after Becket's murder, a "Life" by Benet of St Albans, and an Icelandic translation of the "Quadrilogus" (a composite life based on 12th-century biographers). It provides some unique details, like Thomas speaking with a stammer; these details mostly come from Robert's "Life", which also was a source for Benet's.

Citations

References

Further reading
Thomasskinna: Gl. kgl. saml. 1008 fol. in the Royal Library, Copenhagen ; edited by Agnete Loth. (Early Icelandic Manuscripts in Facsimile; vol. 6.) Copenhagen: Rosenkilde and Bagger, 1964
Thómas saga erkibyskups: A life of Archbishop Thomas Becket, in Icelandic; with English translation, notes and glossary; edited by Eiríkr Magnusson. 2 vols. London: Longmans, 1875-83

14th-century books
Sagas of saints
Icelandic literature
Thomas Becket